John Coleman (born 12 October 1962) is an English football manager and former player. He is the manager of League One side Accrington Stanley.

Playing career
Coleman had a long playing career, mainly in non-league football for Kirkby Town, Burscough, Marine, Southport, Runcorn F.C. Halton, Macclesfield Town, Morecambe, Lancaster City and Ashton United. He also had a short spell in Wales with Rhyl. He was one of the most prolific non-league goalscorers in history, with over 500 goals to his name in a career spanning almost two decades. This success saw him play for the England National Game XI (the England team for semi-professional players) and receive many Player of the Year awards from the clubs he played for.

Managerial career
He was appointed player-manager of Ashton United in 1997. After two years, he joined Accrington Stanley then playing in the Northern Premier League First Division. His 12-and-a-half-year tenure saw the club win three promotions as champions to enter the Football League in 2006. He was also the club's longest ever serving manager. At the time of his departure to Rochdale, Coleman was the third longest serving manager in England, behind Sir Alex Ferguson and Arsène Wenger.

On 24 January 2012, Coleman and his assistant Jimmy Bell were appointed by Rochdale to replace Steve Eyre, who had left the club the previous month. Their contracts were terminated by Rochdale on 21 January 2013 following a poor run in form. In October 2013, Coleman declared his interest in replacing Dave Hockaday as manager of Forest Green Rovers, but returned to Southport as manager on 7 December 2013, with Jimmy Bell once again as his assistant.

He took over as manager of Sligo Rovers in June 2014.

On 18 September 2014, Coleman was confirmed as manager of Accrington Stanley for his second spell with the club.

Managerial statistics

Honours

Manager
Accrington Stanley
League Two: 2017–18
Conference Premier: 2005–06 
Northern Premier: 2002–03 
Northern Premier League Division One: 1999–2000 

Individual
EFL Manager of the Season: 2017–18
League One Manager of the Month: December 2019, November 2020
League Two Manager of the Month: September 2015, March 2017, February 2018, March 2018

References

External links

1962 births
Living people
Footballers from Liverpool
English footballers
England semi-pro international footballers
Association football forwards
Burscough F.C. players
Marine F.C. players
Southport F.C. players
Runcorn F.C. Halton players
Macclesfield Town F.C. players
Rhyl F.C. players
Witton Albion F.C. players
Morecambe F.C. players
Lancaster City F.C. players
Ashton United F.C. players
National League (English football) players
English football managers
Ashton United F.C. managers
Accrington Stanley F.C. managers
Rochdale A.F.C. managers
Southport F.C. managers
Sligo Rovers F.C. managers
English Football League managers
National League (English football) managers
Northern Premier League managers
Knowsley United F.C. players